George Florescu (born 21 May 1984) is a Romanian professional footballer who plays as a defensive midfielder for Sănătatea Cluj. In his career, Florescu also played for teams such as Universitatea Cluj, Sheriff Tiraspol, Torpedo Moscow, FC Midtjylland or Dynamo Moscow, among others.

Club career 
On 23 June 2015, Florescu signed a 1.5-year contract with Azerbaijan Premier League side Gabala FK.

On 20 August 2016, he signed with AC Omonia in Cyprus. He had 48 appearances with the club. On 26 May 2017 the club announced that with the end of the season the player is released.

Career statistics

International

Statistics accurate as of match played 5 June 2012

International goals
Scores and Results show Nigeria's goal tally first

|-
| 1. || 5 June 2010 || Jacques Lemans Arena, Sankt Veit an der Glan, Austria ||  ||  ||  || Friendly||
|}

Honours
Sheriff Tiraspol
Moldovan National Division: 2004–05, 2005–06
Moldovan Cup: 2005–06
Moldovan Super Cup: 2004, 2005

Midtjylland
Danish Superliga: Runner-up 2007–08

Alania Vladikavkaz	
Russian Cup: Runner-up 2010–11

References

External links
 
 

1984 births
Living people
Sportspeople from Cluj-Napoca
Romanian footballers
Association football midfielders
FC Universitatea Cluj players
FC Sheriff Tiraspol players
FC Torpedo Moscow players
FC Midtjylland players
FC Spartak Vladikavkaz players
FC Arsenal Kyiv players
FC Astra Giurgiu players
FC Dynamo Moscow players
Gabala FC players
AC Omonia players
Danish Superliga players
Russian Premier League players
Ukrainian Premier League players
Liga I players
Liga II players
Liga III players
Azerbaijan Premier League players
Cypriot First Division players
Romanian expatriate footballers
Expatriate footballers in Moldova
Expatriate footballers in Russia
Expatriate men's footballers in Denmark
Expatriate footballers in Ukraine
Expatriate footballers in Azerbaijan
Expatriate footballers in Cyprus
Romanian expatriate sportspeople in Russia
Romanian expatriate sportspeople in Denmark
Romanian expatriate sportspeople in Ukraine
Romanian expatriate sportspeople in Azerbaijan
Romanian expatriate sportspeople in Cyprus
Romania under-21 international footballers
Romania international footballers
Romanian football managers